Safe is the second EP by Kittie, a Canadian heavy metal all-women band from London, Ontario. It was released in 2002. It is dedicated "In Loving Memory of Dave Williams". The EP sold 25,000 units in the United States. It received very little promotion, only appearing on 2 major rock/heavy metal magazines.

Track listing

References

2002 EPs
Kittie albums
Albums with cover art by Wes Benscoter
Artemis Records EPs